Dasmurt (also Romanized as Dāsmūrt) is a village in Ahmadfedaleh Rural District, Sardasht District, Dezful County, Khuzestan Province, Iran. At the 2006 census, its population was 53, in 6 families.

References 

Populated places in Dezful County